Caloptilia elongella (commonly known as pale red slender) is a moth of the family Gracillariidae. It is known from all of Europe east to eastern Russia. It is also found in North America from British Columbia, south to California and east in the north to New Hampshire and New York.

The forewings are deep reddish-ochreous, sometimes mixed or suffused with pale yellowish; margins sometimes with darker dots; often an indistinct pale yellowish triangular costal blotch before middle. Hindwings are rather dark grey. The larva is whitish or pale greenish; dorsal line dark grey;head pale brownish or greenish.

There are two generations per year, with adults on wing in June and again during September, after which they hibernate and reappear in spring.

The larvae feed on Alnus glutinosa, Alnus incana and Alnus minor. They mine the leaves of their host plant.

References

External links
 Lepiforum.de
 

elongella
Moths described in 1761
Moths of Europe
Moths of North America
Moths of Asia
Taxa named by Carl Linnaeus